Pavlo Ivanovych Vinkovatov was a Soviet footballer who played as a forward.

External links

1921 births
1987 deaths
Footballers from Kharkiv
People from Kharkov Governorate
Association football forwards
Soviet footballers
Ukrainian footballers
FC Silmash Kharkiv players
FC Dynamo Kyiv players
Soviet football managers
Ukrainian football managers